Judith Ann (J. A.) Jance (born October 27, 1944) is an  American author of  mystery novels. She writes three series of novels, centering on retired Seattle Police Department Detective J. P. Beaumont, Arizona County Sheriff Joanna Brady, and former Los Angeles news anchor turned mystery solver Ali Reynolds.  The Beaumont and Brady series intersect in the novel Partner in Crime, which is both the 16th Beaumount mystery and the 10th Brady mystery. They intersect again in Fire and Ice.

Biography
Jance was born in Watertown, South Dakota, and raised in Bisbee, Arizona (the setting for her Joanna Brady series of novels). Before becoming an author, she worked as a school librarian on a Native American reservation (Tohono O'Odham), and as a teacher and insurance agent.

Jance attended University of Arizona, graduating with a bachelor's degree in education in 1966, then a master's in library science in 1970. In 2000, University of Arizona awarded Jance an honorary doctorate.

In July 2018, Strand Magazine gave Jance its Lifetime Achievement Award to recognize her contributions to the field of crime fiction.

She lives part of the year in Arizona and part of the year in Seattle. Jance uses her initials for her pen name because a publisher told her that disclosing her gender would be a liability for a book about a male detective. At signings, Jance asks bookstores to donate a percentage of their earnings from her appearances to various causes. Over the past 10 years, she has raised more than $250,000 for charity.

Books

J. P. Beaumont
 Until Proven Guilty (1985) 
 Injustice for All (1986) 
 Trial by Fury (1986) (: 1987 Anthony Award for "Best Paperback Original")
 Taking the Fifth (1987) 
 Improbable Cause (1987) 
 A More Perfect Union (1988) 
 Dismissed with Prejudice (1989) 
 Minor in Possession (1990) 
 Payment in Kind (1991) 
 Without Due Process (1993) 
 Failure to Appear (1994) 
 Lying in Wait (1995) 
 Name Withheld (1997) 
 Breach of Duty (1999) 
 Birds of Prey (2002) 
 Partner in Crime (2003) 
 Long Time Gone (2005) 
 Justice Denied (2007) 
 Fire and Ice (2009) 
 Betrayal of Trust (2011) 
 Ring in the Dead (novella, 2013) 
 Second Watch (2013) 
 Stand Down (novella, 2015) 
 Dance of the Bones (2015) (Brandon Walker crossover)
 Still Dead (novella, 2017) 
 Proof of Life (2017)
 Sins Of The Fathers (2019) 
 Nothing to Lose (2022)

Ali Reynolds books
 Edge of Evil (2006) 
 Web of Evil (2007) 
 Hand of Evil (2007) 
 Cruel Intent (2008) 
 Trial By Fire (2009) 
 Fatal Error (2011) 
 Left for Dead (2012) 
 Deadly Stakes (2013) 
 Moving Target (2014) 
 A Last Goodbye (novella, 2014)
 Cold Betrayal (2015) 
 No Honor Among Thieves (novella, 2015)
 Clawback (2016) 
 Random Acts (novella, 2016)
 Man Overboard (2017) 
 Duel to the Death (2018) 
 The A List (2019) 
 Credible Threat (2020) 
 Unfinished Business (2021)

Joanna Brady series
 Desert Heat (1993) 
 Tombstone Courage (1995) 
 Shoot/Don't Shoot (1996) 
 Dead to Rights (1997) 
 Skeleton Canyon (1998) 
 Rattlesnake Crossing (1998) 
 Outlaw Mountain (2000) 
 Devil’s Claw (2001) 
 Paradise Lost (2002) 
 Partner in Crime (2003) 
 Exit Wounds (2004) 
 Dead Wrong (2006) 
 Damage Control (2008) 
 Fire and Ice (2009) 
 Judgment Call (2012) 
 The Old Blue Line (novella, 2014) 
 Remains of Innocence (2014) 
 No Honor Among Thieves (novella, 2015)(Ali Reynolds crossover)
 Random Acts (novella, 2016)(Ali Reynolds crossover)
 Downfall (2016) 
 Field of Bones (2018)
 Missing And Endangered (2021)

Walker Family Mysteries
 Hour of the Hunter (1991) (: 1992 Anthony Award for "Best Paperback Original")
 Kiss of the Bees (2001) 
 Day of the Dead (2004) 
 Queen of the Night (2010) 
 Dance of the Bones (2015) (J.P. Beaumont crossover)

Poetry collection
 After the Fire (1984) 

References

External links

 Official Web site
 Interview with J.A. Jance, A DISCUSSION WITH National Authors on Tour'' TV Series, Episode #104 (1994)

American mystery novelists
American horror novelists
American women novelists
University of Arizona alumni
1944 births
Living people
People from Bisbee, Arizona
People from Watertown, South Dakota
20th-century American novelists
21st-century American novelists
Women horror writers
Women mystery writers
20th-century American women writers
21st-century American women writers